Shakhrisabz Suzani is a type of Suzani textile made in Uzbekistan. The best-known and most valuable Shakhrisabz Suzanis were made in the 19th century, as a part of the bride's dowry. Shakhrisabz in an important market center in Qashqadaryo Region of Uzbekistan and the textiles are an important source of income.

References

External links
Suzani of Shakhrisabz by Barry O'Connell

Uzbekistani rugs and carpets